An online research community (part of Research 2.0) is a part of an emerging and developing area in market research making  use of developments in Web 2.0 technologies and online communities. They allow qualitative research to be conducted efficiently and deeply online.

Both public and private online communities offer opportunities for research, but many brands are wary of sharing company information openly. Invitation-only, private online communities centred on a single brand or customer segment may be the solution. These private communities can also engage customer groups or target consumers who might be difficult to reach using traditional off-line methodologies. Consumers enjoy this new, more participative research approach and the interaction with other users re-introduces the social context often missing from other research approaches that conceive of the consumer as an isolated individual.

Brands also benefit from online communities by having them on-hand to answer questions, test hypotheses, and observe. Online technology can adapt to almost any research need, be it showing creative stimulus material, gathering ideas for innovation and co-creation or simply an instant 'go/no go' needed. The continuity built through online networks brings new possibilities for supporting ideation processes. With a group of people on board, research can keep pace with internal development processes, providing a consumer feedback loop to check new ideas, such as product development, from inception to launch.

In an online research community members (rather than respondents) talk to each other – they exchange ideas and discuss issues with each other. Unlike a panel this lets researchers observe how people interact, the language they use, and lets them raise the questions they want to ask, which results in richer responses.

See also

 Community of practice
 Internet forum
 Internet mediated research
 Market research
 Online deliberation
 Online community manager
 Qualitative research
 Social network
 Social network service
 Social media

Market research
Online research methods
Virtual communities